The 2002–03 Vysshaya Liga season was the 11th season of the Vysshaya Liga, the second level of ice hockey in Russia. 27 teams participated in the league, and Torpedo Nizhny Novgorod and Khimik Voskresensk were promoted to the Russian Superleague.

First round

Western Conference

Eastern Conference

Final round

External links 
 Season on hockeyarchives.info
 Season on hockeyarchives.ru

Russian Major League seasons
2002–03 in Russian ice hockey leagues
Rus